Ikawa may refer to:

Ikawa, Akita, a town in Akita Prefecture
Ikawa, Shizuoka, a former village in Shizuoka Prefecture
Ikawa, Tokushima, a former town in Tokushima Prefecture
Ōigawa Railway Ikawa Line, a railway line in Shizuoka Prefecture
Ikawa Station, a railway station

See also